Sady D. Courville (November 15, 1905, Chataignier, Louisiana – January 3, 1988, Eunice, Louisiana) was a Cajun fiddler noted for his extensive collaboration with Dennis McGee.

Early life
Courville was the son of Eraste Courville who was also a fiddler. In his early teens he bought his first fiddle and started learning from his father and Dennis McGee. By the time he was 16, he was playing dances with Amédé Ardoin around Chataignier and Faiquitaique.

Musical career
In 1929, Courville and McGee were invited to record in New Orleans. Courville was credited only as "second fiddle" on this record.

Personal life
Courville married in June 1929. He decided to take a hiatus from music around this time due to the stress.

Discography
Vieille Musique Acadienne (1977) Swallow LP 6030, 3001
The Complete Early Recordings of Dennis McGee, (1929–1930) Yazoo 2012

References

1905 births
1988 deaths
People from Chataignier, Louisiana
Cajun fiddlers
20th-century American violinists